Taymyr Strait is a 3 km-wide strait in Russia. It separates Taymyr Island from Taymyr Peninsula, and connects the Palander Strait in the west with the Taymyr Gulf in the east.

References

Straits of the Kara Sea
Straits of Krasnoyarsk Krai